Adrian Michael Ward (born July 1, 1982) is a former cornerback for the Minnesota Vikings and the New York Giants. He played college football for the University of Texas at El Paso, after attending Chabot College in Hayward, California. He was drafted by the Vikings in the seventh round of the 2005 NFL Draft. Waived by the Vikings in September 2005, Ward was signed a little over a week later to the Giants' practice squad, on which he competed briefly. In 2007, the Calgary Stampeders of the Canadian Football League (CFL) signed him as a free agent.

References 

1982 births
Living people
Players of American football from Berkeley, California
American football cornerbacks
Minnesota Vikings players
UTEP Miners football players
Chabot Gladiators football players